Calling is the thirteenth single by Vamps released on March 22, 2017. This is the third and final single from the album Underworld.

The single was produced by Kane Churko who is notable for his great work with a long list of artists including Ozzy Osbourne, Five Finger Death Punch and Papa Roach. The single is a heavy rock track.

Aside from “Calling” the single include a cover song, Enjoy The Silence originally by Depeche Mode as the B-side. The limited edition will also come with some live recorded tracks.

The single reached number 8 on the Oricon chart.

Track listing

References 

2017 singles
2017 songs
Spinefarm Records singles
Songs written by Hyde (musician)
Songs written by Kane Churko